Grebenstein is a town in the district of Kassel, in Hesse, Germany. It is located 16 km northwest of Kassel on the German Timber-Frame Road. In 1762 it was the scene of a skirmish between British and French troops during the Seven Years' War.

Gallery

References

External links
 City's Homepage 

Kassel (district)